The Patoka Lake Athletic Conference is a high school athletic conference in southern Indiana.  The conferences members are small high schools located in Crawford, Lawrence, Orange, Perry, and Washington counties. The conference was formed in 1979, and has only had one change in membership history, when member Crawford County added football in 2007 to take football membership to six (Orleans does not field a football team).

Member schools

 Paoli played in both the PLAC and MSC from 1979 until 1985.

Neighboring Conferences
Blue Chip Conference
Pocket Athletic Conference
Southwestern Indiana Athletic Conference
Southwest Seven Football Conference

References
IHSAA Conference Membership
IHSAA State Champions
Southwest Indiana Conference Histories

Indiana high school athletic conferences
High school sports conferences and leagues in the United States